Labrisomus xanti, the Largemouth blenny, is a species of labrisomid blenny native to the Pacific coast of Mexico from Baja California to Jalisco.  It inhabits shallow waters. This species can reach a length of  TL. The specific name honours the collector of the type, the Hungarian zoologist John Xantus (1825-1894).

References

xanti
Taxa named by Theodore Gill
Fish described in 1860